St Joseph's College (formerly St Joseph's Convent School) is a coeducational private day school in Reading, Berkshire, England. In September 2010, it changed its name to St Joseph's College to reflect the move into co-education from being a girls' school. The junior section is known as St Joseph's College Prep School. It was a member of the Girls' Schools Association until the move into coeducation. The school is now a member of the Society of Heads. It won the TES Independent School of the Year award in November 2015.

History
St Joseph's Convent School was founded in 1894 by the Sisters of St Marie Madeleine Postel, whose aim was to provide a good education in a warm and loving atmosphere. Julie Frances Catherine Postel was born in Barfleur, France in 1756, and was a pioneer in education, basing her teaching on the De La Salle method. She took the name Marie Madeleine after being made a superior, died in 1846 and was canonised in 1925.

The Sisters continued to run the school until 1981 when the Rev. Mother Provincial decided that because of the changing role of the Sisters, the school should close. However, after intervention by the Parents’ Association and with the co-operation of the Superior General, the school was able to continue as an educational trust whose members form the governing body. The first lay headmistress was appointed in 1981.

In September 2009, the board of governors voted for the school to become a fully co-educational school. St Joseph's Convent School became St Joseph's College in September 2010 to reflect this change.

Curriculum
From age 3, the curriculum follows the Early Years Foundation Stage, with specialist teaching in Music and PE. Curriculum throughout the Prep School is broad, with specialist teachers increasing as pupils move towards Year 6.

During Years 7 to 9, pupils study Mathematics, English, Modern and Classical Languages, Science, History, Geography, Religious Studies, Design and Technology, Food and Information Technology, Music, Drama and Physical Education. Students also study electronics in the specially built lab. In Years 10 and 11 students are prepared for public GCSE examinations. They all study the core subjects of Mathematics, English, Science and Religious Studies, with up to four further subjects chosen.  In the Sixth Form students may study up to four A Levels. The school hosts many music concerts and school plays. It is considered as a leader in Music and Dramatic Arts locally.

Activities
Pupils are encouraged to be involved in a wide variety of activities and non-academic pursuits. A wide range of clubs and societies are open to all pupils throughout the College. Many take place during the lunch break and include string and brass groups, wind bands, choir, theatre studies, science club and a variety of sports. There are opportunities to be involved in the community through a well planned enrichment programme which includes Young Enterprise competitions and charity events in aid of CAFOD and OXFAM.

Notable former pupils

Marianne Faithfull, singer
Alma Cogan, singer
Sally Oldfield, musician
Anne Hardy, political activist and philanthropist.

References

External links
 Profile isc.co.uk; accessed 22 October 2014. 
 Independent Schools Inspectorate Reports; accessed 22 October 2014.
 http://www.gbsswimschool.com/

Private schools in Reading, Berkshire
Roman Catholic private schools in the Diocese of Portsmouth
1910 establishments in England
Educational institutions established in 1910